Community Chickens is a joint Mother Earth News and Grit online magazine published by Ogden Publications in Topeka, Kansas. It was created by Oscar H. Will III, Cheryl Long,  Bryan Welch, and Taylor Miller in 2009.

What it does
The site features original work by well-known chicken bloggers on a variety of poultry-related topics for small and urban farmers, primarily DIY-related articles, sweepstakes, health-related articles, and recipes. The variety of issues covered aim to help readers fight for the right to raise chickens in their communities in order to live more sustainable, green-friendly lives. To this end, Community Chickens releases a free, weekly newsletter to subscribers every Tuesday morning.

Related magazines
Subsequent to Community Chickens, Ogden Publications created and launched another online magazine dedicated to beekeeping called Keeping Backyard Bees in 2014.

References

External links
 Community Chickens homepage

2009 establishments in Kansas
Agricultural magazines
Magazines established in 2009
Magazines published in Kansas
Mass media in Topeka, Kansas
Online magazines published in the United States
Poultry farming in the United States
Weekly magazines published in the United States